Lakhan Khurd  is a village in Kapurthala district of Punjab State, India. Khurd is Persian language word which means small. The village is administrated by a Sarpanch, who is an elected representative.

Demography 
According to the report published by Census India in 2011, Lakhan Khurd has total number of 224 houses and population of 1,170 of which include 610 males and 560 females. Literacy rate of Lakhan Khurd is 72.59%, lower than state average of 75.84%.  The population of children under the age of 6 years is 134 which is 11.45% of total population of GobinLakhan Khurddpur, and child sex ratio is approximately  811, lower than state average of 846.

Population data

Air travel connectivity 
The closest airport to the village is Sri Guru Ram Dass Jee International Airport.

Villages in Kapurthala

References

External links
  Villages in Kapurthala
 Kapurthala Villages List

Villages in Kapurthala district